The 1974–75 Liga Nacional Segunda División de Baloncesto was the second tier of the 1974–75 Spanish basketball season.

Regular season

Group A

Group B

Group C (Canary Islands)

Championship round

Promotion/relegation playoffs

Granollers vs Pineda
Granollers 65-64 Pineda
Pineda 77-66 Granollers

Náutico vs Águilas
Náutico 88-69 Águilas 
Águilas  97-76 Náutico

References

External links
Hemeroteca El Mundo Deportivo

Segunda División de Baloncesto
Segunda
Second level Spanish basketball league seasons